The Mainzer Stadtschreiber (City clerk in Mainz) is an annual German literature award. It is awarded by ZDF, 3sat and the city of Mainz and was founded in 1984. The award is endowed with €12,500. Additionally the laureate receives the right to live in the town clerk's domicile in the Gutenberg Museum in Mainz for one year. Together with ZDF, the recipient is able to produce a documentary based on a free choice of topic.

Recipients

 1985 Gabriele Wohmann
 1986 H. C. Artmann
 1987 
 1988 Sarah Kirsch
 1989 Horst Bienek
 1990 Günter Kunert
 1991 
 1992 Katja Behrens
 1993 
 1994 Libuše Moníková
 1995 Peter Härtling
 1996 Peter Bichsel
 1997 Friedrich Christian Delius
 1998 Erich Loest
 1999 Tilman Spengler
 2000/2001 Hanns-Josef Ortheil
 2002 Katja Lange-Müller
 2003 Urs Widmer
 2004 Raoul Schrott
 2005 Sten Nadolny
 2006 Patrick Roth
 2007 Ilija Trojanow
 2008 Michael Kleeberg
 2009 Monika Maron
 2010 Josef Haslinger
 2011 Ingo Schulze
 2012 Kathrin Röggla
 2013 Peter Stamm
 2014 Judith Schalansky
 2015 Feridun Zaimoğlu
 2016 Clemens Meyer
 2017 Abbas Khider
 2018 Anna Katharina Hahn
 2019 Eva Menasse
 2020/2021 Eugen Ruge
 2022 Dörte Hansen
 2023 Alois Hotschnig

References

External links
 

German literary awards
Awards established in 1984
Culture in Mainz